Echo Lake State Park is a public recreation area in North Conway, New Hampshire, that features  Echo Lake and two rock ledges with scenic views, Cathedral Ledge and White Horse Ledge. Activities include swimming, hiking, non-motorized boating, picnicking and fishing. There is a one-mile trail around the lake.

A mile-long auto road and hiking trails lead to the top of Cathedral Ledge (summit elevation ) with views across the Saco River Valley to the White Mountains and Kearsarge North.

Both Cathedral Ledge and White Horse Ledge are popular for rock and ice climbing.

History

In 1899, Cathedral Ledge was purchased for $1,000 by a group of area visitors and local residents, and in 1900, White Horse Ledge was purchased. Both were later deeded to the State of New Hampshire. In 1943, the Society for the Protection of New Hampshire Forests joined with the state to raise funds to buy Echo Lake, protecting it from commercial development.

References

External links

Echo Lake State Park New Hampshire Department of Natural and Cultural Resources

State parks of New Hampshire
Parks in Carroll County, New Hampshire
North Conway, New Hampshire